Tomi Hirvonen (born January 11, 1977) is a Finnish former professional ice hockey forward who spent most of his career playing in the Finnish Liiga.

He was drafted by the Colorado Avalanche 207th overall in the 1995 NHL Entry Draft however never signed a contract to play in North America. He played with Ilves for majority of his professional career, concluding an 11-year career at the end of the 2005–06 season.

Career statistics

Regular season and playoffs

International

External links

1977 births
Colorado Avalanche draft picks
Finnish ice hockey centres
Ice hockey people from Tampere
Ilves players
JYP Jyväskylä players
KOOVEE players
Lahti Pelicans players
Living people
Skellefteå AIK players